Krum Milev was a Bulgarian football player and manager. He is often considered as the most successful Bulgarian coach.

He played for Botev Sofia, Slavia Sofia and Lokomotiv Sofia. He obtained 18 caps with Bulgaria.

He was the topscorer of the Bulgarian National Football Division 1937-38.

He managed CSKA Sofia, winning the Bulgarian league 11 times with them, Bulgaria, Beroe Stara Zagora and Beşiktaş.

Milev holds the record for the longest serving manager (of a single club) in Bulgarian football, having been in charge of CSKA Sofia for 16 years.

References

1915 births
2000 deaths
Bulgarian footballers
Bulgaria international footballers
PFC Slavia Sofia players
FC Lokomotiv 1929 Sofia players
Bulgarian football managers
PFC CSKA Sofia managers
PFC Beroe Stara Zagora managers
Beşiktaş J.K. managers
Bulgarian expatriate sportspeople in Turkey
Bulgaria national football team managers
Bulgarian expatriate football managers
Association football forwards
Footballers from Sofia